Giulio Ciro Lepschy, FBA (born 14 January 1935) is an Italian academic. He was Professor of Italian at the University of Reading from 1975 to 1997.

Born in 1935, Lepschy attended the University of Pisa and the Scuola Normale Superiore di Pisa. He carried out research at various European universities until 1964, when he was appointed to a lectureship at the University of Reading. He was promoted to a readership in 1967 and then to Professor of Italian in 1975. He remained in that post full-time until 1997, when reduced his workload to part-time; he retired completely in 2000.

In 1987, Lepschy was elected a Fellow of the British Academy, the United Kingdom's national academy for the humanities. The Academy awarded him its Serena Medal in 2000, awarded annually for "eminent services towards the furtherance of the study of Italian history, philosophy or music, literature, art, or economics."

Bibliography 

 Lepschy, Giulio C.. Some Problems in Linguistic Theory. United Kingdom, Academic Press, 1975.
Lepschy, Anna Laura, and Lepschy, Giulio C.. The Italian Language Today. United Kingdom, Routledge, 1992.
Lepschy, Giulio C.. Mother tongues and other reflections on the Italian language. Buffalo, University of Toronto Press, 2002.

Lepschy, Giulio C.. History of Linguistics Volume II: Classical and Medieval Linguistics. United Kingdom, Taylor & Francis, 2014.
Lepschy, Giulio C.. History of Linguistics Vol III: Renaissance and Early Modern Linguistics. United Kingdom, Taylor & Francis, 2014.
Davies, Anna Morpurgo, and Lepschy, Giulio C.. History of Linguistics, Volume IV: Nineteenth-Century Linguistics. United Kingdom, Taylor & Francis, 2016.
Giulio C. Lepschy, A survey of structural linguistics, London: Faber & Faber, 1970. Pp. 192.

References

External links 

 Giulio Lepschy at WorldCat

Living people
1935 births
Italian academics
University of Pisa alumni
Scuola Normale Superiore di Pisa alumni
Academics of the University of Reading
Fellows of the British Academy